Enrique Rebora (5 October 1924 – 21 July 1999) was an Argentine sports shooter. He competed in the 50 metre running target event at the 1972 Summer Olympics.

References

External links
 

1924 births
1999 deaths
Argentine male sport shooters
Olympic shooters of Argentina
Shooters at the 1972 Summer Olympics